The Virgin Islands competed at the 2022 World Aquatics Championships in Budapest, Hungary, from June 17, 2022, to July 3, 2022.

Swimming

Virgin Islands entered two swimmers.

Men

Women

References

Nations at the 2022 World Aquatics Championships
Virgin Islands at the World Aquatics Championships
World Aquatics Championships